The Menkere (Meŋkere) is a river in Sakha Republic (Yakutia), Russia. It is one of the major tributaries of the Lena.

The Menkere flows across desolate territories of Zhigansky District.

Course
The Menkere is a right tributary of the Lena. It flows first roughly westwards. After leaving the mountains it heads southwestwards into the Central Yakutian Lowland, forming meanders in the flat permafrost floodplain. After a stretch it bends and flows roughly northwestwards. Finally it bends again and heads westwards for a stretch until it joins the right bank of the Lena  from its mouth, near the mouth of the Motorchuna in the opposite bank. 

The last half of the river course describes a wide, roughly semicircular, arch around the southern area of Ulakhan-Kyuel lake.

Fauna
Among the fish species found in the waters of the Menkere lenok, pike, grayling and taimen are worth mentioning.

See also
List of rivers of Russia

References

External links 
Fishing & Tourism in Yakutia
Путешествие на Мэнкэрэ в поиске новых мест!

Rivers of the Sakha Republic
Verkhoyansk Range
Central Yakutian Lowland